Bernard Paul (born 13 April 1944) is a French former professional tennis player.

Active in the 1960s and 1970s, Paul was ranked amongst the French top-10 at his peak. His best results in grand slam tournaments came in doubles, twice reaching the men's doubles third round at Roland Garros.

References

External links
 
 

1944 births
Living people
French male tennis players